Sheikh Jackson is a 2017 Egyptian drama film directed by Amr Salama. It was screened in the Special Presentations section at the 2017 Toronto International Film Festival. It was selected as the Egyptian entry for the Best Foreign Language Film at the 90th Academy Awards, but it was not nominated.

Plot
An Islamic cleric who likes to dress as Michael Jackson is thrown into a tailspin in the wake of the singer's death.

Cast
Ahmed El-Fishawy
Maged El Kedwany
Ahmed Malek
Salma Abudeif
Basma
Dorra

Controversy
In December 2017 in Egypt the film was referred to Al-Azhar University for investigation of blasphemy, despite it having been cleared by Egypt's censorship committee. When film critic Tarek El-Shenawy defended the film, many Facebook readers responded with angry insults against him and the film.

See also
 List of submissions to the 90th Academy Awards for Best Foreign Language Film
 List of Egyptian submissions for the Academy Award for Best Foreign Language Film

References

External links
 

2017 films
2017 drama films
Egyptian drama films
2010s Arabic-language films
Cultural depictions of Michael Jackson